Cultus Sanguine was an Italian black metal band, characterised by gloomy themes and soundscapes.

Bio
Cultus Sanguine was founded as a duo in 1993, but soon after expanded to a trio after adding a drummer. After a 1995 EP, they added the keyboards player Rex Nebulah before signing to Candlelight Records for the 1998 album Shadow's Blood. Following this the guitarist/bassist Aqua Regis and drummer Custus Arckanorum left the group, and guitarist Aurian and drummer Nox Perpetua joined. Two further releases appeared on Season of Mist before the group disbanded in 2001.

Line-up
 Joe Fergieph (vocals)
 Aqua Regis (Roberto Mammarella of Monumentum; guitar and bass)
 Custos Arcanorum (drums)
 Rex Nebulah (keyboards)
 Aurian (guitar)
 Nox Perpetua (Fabrizio Cislaghi of Macbeth) (drums)
 Ouranos - keyboards

Discography
Cultus Sanguine EP (Wounded Love Records/Avantgarde Music, 1995)
 Shadow's Blood (Candlelight Records, 1998)
 The Sum of All Fears (Season of Mist, 1999)
 WAR Vol III (Season of Mist, 2000)

References

Italian black metal musical groups
Season of Mist artists